Marion Keene (also known as Marion Davis, born Marion Davison, c. 1933) was a British big band singer in the early 1950s with British bands such as the Jack Parnell Orchestra and Oscar Rabin Band. Keene replaced Alma Cogan in the 1959 Eurovision Song Contest British Final but wasn't selected to become the British entry in the Eurovision Final heald later the same year.

Recordings
Parlophone 
Marion Davis with Oscar Rabin Band
F 2344  March 1949  "A Little Bird Told Me"
F 2369	 July 1949  "Put Your Shoes On Lucy"
F 2400	 February 1950  "Jealous Heart" (with Marjorie Daw)
F 2404	 March 1950  "Why Not Now" (with Dennis Hale) /  "Don't Cry Joe"
F 2435	 December 1950  "Have I Told You Lately That I Love You" (with Marjorie Daw)
F 2455	 April 1951  "Listenin' To The Green Grass Grow" (with Marjorie Daw)

Nixa 
Marion Davis with Eric Winstone Orchestra
NY 7742  "Turn Back The Hands Of Time" (with The Stagecoachers)  /  "Easy Come, Easy Go" (with Franklyn Boyd)
NY 7743  March 1952  "I Don't Care"

HMV
HMV POP 203 / 7M 395  April 1956  "Fortune Teller" / "A Dangerous Age"
HMV POP 375  July 1957  "In The Middle Of An Island" / "It's Not For Me To Say" (with orchestra cond. by Frank Cordell)

RCA
RCA LOP 1001  1958 "Rose-Marie" (with Julie Andrews)  Cast Member - RCA LOP 1001 (RD-27143 in England)

References

External links
Ron Simmonds's web site "jazzprofessional" for more details on big bands and Marion Davis

British women singers
Living people
Year of birth missing (living people)